The University of Jendouba is a public university in Jendouba, Tunisia. The university is oriented primarily toward sciences and information technology.

Campuses 
The university has a campus in Jendouba.

References

See also
List of schools in Tunisia
List of universities in Tunisia

 
Jendouba
Educational institutions established in 2003
2003 establishments in Tunisia